The Long Dark is a first-person survival video game developed and published by Hinterland Studios. The player assumes the role of crash-landed bush pilot Will Mackenzie who must survive the frigid Canadian wilderness after a geomagnetic storm. The game received seed financing from the Canada Media Fund, and further funding was secured through a successful Kickstarter campaign in October 2013.

An alpha version was released through Steam Early Access in September 2014. The alpha version was later launched on the Xbox One as one of the first two launch titles associated with Microsoft's Game Preview Program in June 2015. Early reviews of the alpha release were generally positive, and the game went on to sell around 750,000 copies by April 2016. It was officially released on all aforementioned platforms on August 1, 2017, as well as for PlayStation 4. In 2017, it was announced that a film adaptation of The Long Dark was in the works. On September 17, 2020, it was announced that the game would be coming to Nintendo Switch later that same day.

Gameplay 

The Long Dark is a survival game which takes place in the frigid Canadian wilderness, and is played from a first-person perspective. The gameplay is stated by the developers to be a "survival simulation that accounts for body temperature, caloric intake, hunger/thirst, fatigue, wind-chill, wildlife, and a host of other environmental factors." The Long Dark has three game modes available to the player, "Story mode", "Survival mode", and "Challenge mode".

The game's map is divided up into a number of regions: Mystery Lake, Coastal Highway, Pleasant Valley, Forlorn Muskeg, Desolation Point, Timberwolf Mountain, Mountain Town, Broken Railroad, Hushed River Valley, Bleak Inlet, Ash Canyon, and Blackrock Mountain. All areas are interconnected.

Survival mode
Survival mode is set in an open world environment where the player can choose the region they wish to spawn in, and may access any region in the game. The objective is for the player to survive as long as possible by scavenging and utilizing whatever resources they may find within the world. This includes commodities such as food, water, firewood, medicine, and tools such as weapons, axes, knives, and a myriad of other items. Wildlife is also present, such as deer which can be hunted for food, and wolves and bears which are a constant threat to the player as they venture outside. Tools and items degrade over time, forcing the player to make careful decisions regarding their condition and their eventual need for repair. Fire, being a primary component, is necessary for warmth and cooking. The player has to forage for wood and fuel on a regular basis to stay alive. The player can get sick from food poisoning and disease. The Long Dark simulates a full day/night cycle, which is a fundamental part of the game. The game also simulates temperature and wind-chill, encouraging the player to monitor the weather and their clothing carefully at all times to prevent death from exposure. Initially, the game did not feature varied experience modes, but due to player demand, Hinterland added three experience modes to accommodate a range of playstyles, and a fourth mode added later. The easiest mode, "Pilgrim", is for players looking for a more exploratory experience, "Voyageur" is a middle ground and the most well rounded with regard to exploration and survival, "Stalker" offers a more hardcore survival experience, and "Interloper" is for players looking for a punishing, difficult experience.

Added late in 2017, "Custom" lets the player customize many of the gameplay elements to create a unique gameplay experience.

The save game system enforces careful decision making by the player; saving only when the player's avatar enters a building, sleeps, passes time or receives an injury. The only possible ending to the game is player death, with no way to "beat" the game. When the player dies the original save file is deleted, forcing the player to start a new game.

Story mode

Unlike Survival mode, Story mode (also known as "Wintermute") is an episodic adventure game, with survival elements, and does not have a permadeath feature. In Wintermute, the player assumes the role of a crash-landed pilot struggling to survive after a geomagnetic storm and cannot freely travel across the game world, being restricted to certain geographic regions.

Story mode was initially planned to be released late 2014, but was pushed back to late 2016. Development was pushed back again and the game was ultimately released on August 1, 2017, with the first two episodes of the five-part story released together. Episode one was entitled "Do Not Go Gentle" and episode two is called "Luminance Fugue".

Due to complaints by players, a new version of episode one and two was released in December 2018, with many changes made to the gameplay, presentation and mission structure. Episode three, known as "Crossroads Elegy", was released October 22, 2019. Episode four entitled "Fury, Then Silence" was released October 6, 2021. Raphael van Lierop has stated in October 2022 that episode five is planned to release in late 2023.

Development
Following completion of his work as director on Warhammer 40,000: Space Marine, Raphael van Lierop left Relic Entertainment to work on projects which he felt were "more personal" and "more representative of [his] values". Van Lierop also left Vancouver, moving his family from the city to the northern part of Vancouver Island. Inspired by these new surroundings, he formed Hinterland and began to work on The Long Dark, a game about surviving the Canadian wilderness. Hinterland wanted to explore a post apocalyptic world from the fringes, away from the urban apocalypse, which "we've all seen a million times" and away from "B-movie cliches like zombies". Van Lierop was also keen to impart a Canadian identity upon the game, having been frustrated with homogenised AAA video games which sacrificed character for mass market appeal, he summed up his approach with, "I'm Canadian. This game is Canadian. Deal with it."

When van Lierop announced the Hinterland team in September 2013, members included Alan Lawrance, formerly a lead at Volition, Marianne Krawczyk, writer of the God of War series, and David Chan, BioWare's first audio designer. A year later, they were joined by Ken Rolston, the lead designer of The Elder Scrolls III: Morrowind. Hinterland operated as a virtual team, with its members remote workers. Lawrance cites remote work as a crucial factor in his decision to join Hinterland.

Hinterland obtained seed funding from the Canada Media Fund, and in September 2013, launched a Kickstarter campaign for The Long Dark to raise C$200,000 and build a community around the game. The campaign was successful, raising C$256,617 upon its completion in October 2013. PayPal contributions following the Kickstarter campaign pushed the final total to over C$275,000 by March 2014. Hinterland announced the game's voice cast during the Kickstarter campaign, allowing The Long Dark to capitalise on the actors' individual fan bases; the cast announced were Mark Meer, Elias Toufexis, Jennifer Hale and David Hayter. Hinterland were mindful of the game's scope, not wanting to expand the team's size and increase risk, and so limited their Kickstarter stretch goals to those that added quality, rather than those that added in-game content.

Van Lierop spoke of their studio's approach to early access at the 2015 Game Developers Conference where he warned against allowing the player community to dictate the game's direction. Van Lierop spoke of the differing play styles in the game's audience; though players that preferred a "hardcore survival" experience were in the minority, they were most vocal in the player community. Had Hinterland pandered to those requests, they might have alienated the silent majority of their player community.

In April 2016, Van Lierop posted an update about the Story-mode release, explaining that Hinterland had elected to delay the launch of Story mode until it contained 4–6 hours of initial gameplay instead of the originally planned 2 hours. He also declined to set a release date, saying, "You won't get another promise from me about when it will ship, until we are close enough to being done with it that I can say with 100% certainty, and give you a definitive date that I know isn't going to end up with us pushing out an experience we aren't 100% satisfied with". He pointed to the evolution of Sandbox mode as another reason for delay, saying that its popularity had grown to the point that Hinterland decided to bring back regular updates for it, even though it was originally conceived merely as a test-bed for the Story mode. His post also provided a developmental road-map with short-term, medium-term, and long-term goals for additions and improvements.

In February 2020, the developers asked Nvidia to remove The Long Dark from GeForce Now, a cloud streaming service, shortly after the service exited beta and went "live". The developers said that their game was improperly placed on the service without any sort of licensing agreement; Nvidia agreed to remove it as a result. The game returned to GeForce Now in May 2020 after Nvidia announced they would switch to an opt-in policy for including games on their platform.

Reception

Early access
Following a period of alpha access exclusive to backers of the crowdfunding campaign, a version of the game featuring only its sandbox-style survival mode was released on Steam Early Access in September 2014 for Windows. It later arrived on Linux in November 2015. Early impressions from critics were generally favorable, but noted the incomplete nature of the game.

Leif Johnson, writing for PC Gamer in June 2014 felt that the game's small unchanging map rewarded route memorisation whereas the game was most engaging when allowing the player to discover its systems. Andy Kelly, writing for the same publication a month later, praised the atmosphere, highlighting the art style, sound design and lighting. Kelly felt that the game's "focus on atmosphere and environmental survival" made it "[stand] out in an increasingly crowded genre". Also at PC Gamer Martin Musgrave wrote that The Long Dark made for one of the greatest survival games to date.

At GameSpot, Shaun McInnis had similar thoughts, seeing that while the survival genre was becoming ever more crowded, The Long Dark was "one of the few games in this genre focused on capturing the solitary wonder of fighting to staying alive in the brutal wilderness". John Walker, writing at Rock, Paper, Shotgun in August 2014, enjoyed the game and found it "impressively full of things to do", but felt that the accelerated passage of time detracted from the realism. In an early access review for GameSpot in October 2014, Nick Capozzoli too criticised unrealistic systems, noting that one should not need "a dozen energy bars and a pound of venison to sustain yourself day-to-day" and that "a crowbar [shouldn't] lose half its integrity after being used to pry open a couple lockers". Instead of stretching his resources as a survivalist would, he felt "like an insatiable force that roves through the environment, picking it clean." Like Johnson, he criticised the limited area given to explore. With an update later that October, Hinterland doubled the size of the playable area, and expanded it again in February 2015 to bring the size of the game world to 25 km2.

Wired writer Matt Peckham labelled The Long Dark a "troubling yet beautiful gem", and joined IGN columnist Lucy O'Brien in recognizing the game's beautiful artistic vision, with O'Brien noting that "Developer Hinterland has gone to great lengths to make the world itself a beautiful place to explore". In a 2015 interview with Creative Director Raphael van Lierop about The Long Darks launch on Xbox One, Gameranx's Holly Green addressed the unique nature of the game's survival mechanics, writing it was "one of the first pure survival games on console, separating the genre from its horror roots and taking its themes of minimalist resource management to their most logical conclusion".

Commercial reception
By January 2015, the game had sold 250,000 copies and by August 2015, 500,000 copies had been sold. In April 2016, Hinterland announced that over 750,000 copies had been sold across all platforms and expressed gratitude over the 99.78% approval rating from the Steam user-base. As of September 2019, 3.3 million copies have been sold. Sales reached 5 million copies by 2021.

Accolades
The game was nominated for "Best Art Direction", "Best Game Design" and "Best Music/Sound Design", and won the award for both "Best Writing" and "Strategy/Simulation" at the 2018 Webby Awards.

References

External links

 

2017 video games
Crowdfunded video games
Early access video games
Indie video games
Kickstarter-funded video games
Linux games
Open-world video games
MacOS games
Nintendo Switch games
Permadeath games
PlayStation 4 games
Post-apocalyptic video games
Simulation video games
Video games with Steam Workshop support
Survival video games
Video games developed in Canada
Video games featuring protagonists of selectable gender
Video games scored by Sascha Dikiciyan
Video games set in Canada
Windows games
Xbox Cloud Gaming games
Xbox One games
Xbox Play Anywhere games
Single-player video games